Alexander or Alex Riley may refer to:

Alexander Riley (merchant) (1778–1833), English merchant
Alexander Riley (tracker) (1884–1970), Australian Aboriginal tracker
Alex Riley (born 1981), American professional wrestler
Alex Riley (comedian) (born 1968), English comedian
Alex Riley (politician), American attorney and politician

See also
 Alexandra Riley (born 1987), American-born New Zealand footballer